Aleksandr Aleksandrovich Gryazin (born 23 August 1974) is a Russian retired professional footballer. He made his professional debut in the Russian Second Division in 1992 for PFC CSKA-d Moscow.

References

1974 births
People from Lyubertsy
Living people
Russian footballers
PFC Krylia Sovetov Samara players
Russian Premier League players
FC Saturn Ramenskoye players
FC Moscow players
FC Rubin Kazan players
FC Salyut Belgorod players
Russian expatriate footballers
Expatriate footballers in Israel
FC Metallurg Lipetsk players
Association football midfielders
FC Spartak-MZhK Ryazan players
Sportspeople from Moscow Oblast